Ottone is a 1723 opera by George Frideric Handel.

Ottone may also refer to:

 Ottone (name), including a list of people with the name
 Ottone, Emilia-Romagna, a comune in the Province of Piacenza, Italy
 Ottone in villa, a 1713 opera by Antonio Vivaldi
 Muscat Ottone, a white wine grape variety

See also
 Oddone